HMS Fittleton, originally named HMS Curzon, was a wooden-hulled  of the Royal Navy which spent most of her career in the Royal Naval Reserve. She was sunk in a collision with HMS Mermaid on 20 September 1976 whilst en route to Hamburg for an official visit. Twelve naval service personnel (eleven from the Royal Naval Reserve along with one from the Royal Navy) lost their lives, making this the worst peacetime accident involving the Royal Naval Reserve.

History

The ship ran aground at the entrance to Shoreham harbour, West Sussex on 25 May 1954, but she was refloated the next day. Curzon was part of the Reserve Fleet based at Hythe from 1955 until 1959. In March 1959 she had her Mirrlees engines replaced with Napier Deltic engines at Portsmouth, prior to being commissioned into the Royal Naval Reserve as HMS Curzon on 16 November 1960. She replaced HMS Bickington and docked at Maxwell's Wharf, Shoreham, home of Sussex Division RNR. She was refitted in January–May 1965 and again in January–May 1967, both at Chatham Dockyard.

She was renamed HMS Fittleton on 1 January 1976 and reassigned to the Channel Group of the Royal Naval Reserve.

Sinking

Regularly manned by a combination of Sussex and London Division RNR personnel (from HMS President), she sailed from Shoreham on 11 September 1976 with a crew largely drawn from London Division RNR to take part in Operation Teamwork, a NATO exercise in the North Sea. Following the exercise, on 20 September the ship proceeded in company with six other British minesweepers towards Hamburg for a three-day official visit to the port, after which she was to return to Shoreham. This required HMS Fittleton to steam close behind and to the side of Mermaid at about 3:30pm to pick up a line.

Fittleton was caught in a low pressure area that exists near to the hull of a ship under way and was drawn close to the frigate HMS Mermaid by hydrodynamic forces. A minor collision ensued and the Fittleton moved forward to try and exit the situation but instead was hit amidships by the bow of the much larger Mermaid and turned over within a minute. Thirty-two survivors were picked from the sea and the upturned hull by the accompanying ships, and German and Dutch vessels joined Royal Navy ships in searching for survivors, with divers entering the floating upturned hull. Attempts to keep Fittleton afloat by passing minesweeping cables underneath her propeller shafts failed when the lines parted.

Aftermath

The following day, 21 September 1976, a marine crane, Magnus lifted the wreck of the Fittleton from the seabed and the ship was taken to Den Helder in the Netherlands where she was made watertight. She was then towed back to Chatham Dockyard. Five bodies were found on the ship but seven were missing, presumed drowned.

Naval police were called in when the ship arrived at Chatham on 11 October to investigate the theft of cash following the salvage of the vessel. Fittleton's crew had been paid just an hour before the sinking, with seamen receiving £50 or £87 depending upon rank, and large amounts of sodden money were scattered around the wreck when it was raised. However, when the ship reached Chatham only £174 could be found, and six of the ten wallets also recovered were found to be empty.

Fittleton was sold to Liguria Maritime Ltd for scrapping and scrapped the following year. HMS Mermaid was later sold to the Malaysian Navy. An enquiry into the disaster took place between 24 September 1976 and 13 October 1976, and the full report was made public in 2005 under the Thirty-year rule.  A memorial window was commissioned for the church at Fittleton in Wiltshire.

References

External links
 https://web.archive.org/web/20111003104051/http://www.wessex.hampshire.org.uk/Page/Newsletters/Wessex_O_B_News_3.pdf Wessex News article

 

Ton-class minesweepers of the Royal Navy
Ships built in Southampton
1954 ships
Cold War minesweepers of the United Kingdom
Maritime incidents in 1954
Maritime incidents in 1976
Ships sunk in collisions